Nuclear pore glycoprotein p62
is a protein complex associated with the nuclear envelope. The p62 protein remains associated with the nuclear pore complex-lamina fraction. p62 is synthesized as a soluble cytoplasmic precursor of 61 kDa followed by modification that involve addition of N-acetylglucosamine residues, followed by association with other complex proteins. In humans it is encoded by the NUP62 gene.
 
The nuclear pore complex is a massive structure that extends across the nuclear envelope, forming a gateway that regulates the flow of macromolecules between the nucleus and the cytoplasm. Nucleoporins are the main components of the nuclear pore complex in eukaryotic cells. The protein encoded by this gene is a member of the FG repeat containing nucleoporins and is localized to the nuclear pore central plug. This protein associates with the importin alpha/beta complex which is involved in the import of proteins containing nuclear localization signals. Multiple transcript variants of this gene encode a single protein isoform.

Structure

P62 is a serine/threonine rich protein of ~520 amino acids, with tetrapeptide repeats on the amino terminus and a series of alpha-helical regions with hydrophobic heptad repeats forming beta-propeller domain. P62 assembles into a complex containing 3 addition proteins, p60, p54 and p45  forming the p62 complex of ~235 kDa. O-GlcNAcylation appears to be involved in the assembly and disassembly of p62 into higher order complexes, and a serine/threonine rich linker region between Ser270 to Thr294 appear to be regulatory. The p62 complex is localized to both the nucleoplasmic and cytoplasmic sides of the pore complex and the relative diameter of p62 complex relative to the nuclear pore complex suggests it interacts in pore gating.

Function

P62 appears to interact with mRNA during transport out of the nucleus. P62 also interacts with a nuclear transport factor (NTF2) protein that is involved in trafficking proteins between cytoplasm and nucleus. Another protein, importin (beta) binds to the helical rod section of p62, which also
binds NTF2 suggesting the formation of a higher order gating complex. Karyopherin beta2 (transportin), a riboprotein transporter also interacts with p62. P62 also interacts with Nup93, and when Nup98 is depleted p62 fails to assemble with nuclear pore complexes. Mutant pores could not dock/transport proteins with nuclear localization signals or M9 import signals.

Pathology

Antibodies to p62 complex are involved in one or more autoimmune diseases. P62 glycosylation is increased in diabetes and may influence its association with other diseases. p62 is also more frequent in Stage IV primary biliary cirrhosis and is prognostic for severe disease.

Interactions
Nucleoporin 62 has been shown to interact with:
 HSF2, 
 KPNB1, 
 NUTF2,
 TRAF3,  and
 XPO1,
 Nup93.

References

Further reading

Autoantigens
Glycoproteins